Daru Rilwan is a small village located in North Bank, The Gambia, a country in West Africa. It has a permanent population of around 1,045 inhabitants and is situated 37 metres above sea level. The town has a Muslim mosque.

References

Populated places in the Gambia